The 2007–08 OK Liga was the 39th season of the top-tier league of rink hockey in Spain.

Barcelona Sorli Discau finished the league as champion.

Competition format
Sixteen teams joined the league.

The eight first teams at the end of the regular season qualified for the playoffs while the three last teams were relegated to Primera División.

Regular season

Playoffs
Quarterfinals were played with a best-of-three format, while semifinals and final were played with a best-of-five series.

Seeded teams played games 1, 2 and 5 of each series at home.

Final standings

Copa del Rey

The 2008 Copa del Rey was the 65th edition of the Spanish men's roller hockey cup. It was played in Igualada between the eight first qualified teams after the first half of the season.

Noia Freixenet won its 2nd cup, ten years after its first one.

References

External links
Real Federación Española de Patinaje

OK Liga seasons
2008 in roller hockey
2007 in roller hockey
2008 in Spanish sport
2007 in Spanish sport